Judit is a feminine given name related to Judith. Notable people with the name include:

Judit Bar-Ilan (1958–2019), Israeli computer scientist
Judit Elek (born 1937), Hungarian film director and screenwriter
Judit Földing-Nagy (born 1965), Hungarian runner who specializes in the marathon
Judit Gófitz (1701–1723), Hungarian conjoined twins
Judit Kovács (born 1969), Hungarian retired high jumper
Judit Mascó (born 1969), Spanish model, television host and writer
Judit Polgár (born 1976), Hungarian chess Grandmaster
Judit Temes (born 1930), Hungarian swimmer and Olympic champion
Judit Varga (born 1976), Hungarian middle-distance runner
Judit Varga (born 1979), Hungarian composer

Hungarian feminine given names

de:Judit
nl:Judit